Louis Overbeeke (6 September 1926 – 8 July 1989) was a Dutch footballer who played as a forward. He gained 3 caps for the Netherlands national team.

Career
Born in Hoogerheide, Overbeeke played mainly for DOSKO and NAC, beside his hometown club METO. As a player, he was renowned for his a quick movements and powerful strike. He gained 3 caps for the Netherlands national team. During his time at NAC, he won the Eerste Klasse A in the 1954–55 season. He was a prolific scorer for NAC, and provided many assists to another NAC legend Leo Canjels.

Personal life
At the time of his retirement in 1961, Overbeeke took over his family business, a gas station and a taxi stand. He died on 7 July 1989 at age 58.

Honours
NAC
Eerste Klasse A: 1954–55

References

External links
 

1926 births
1989 deaths
People from Woensdrecht
Association football forwards
Dutch footballers
Netherlands international footballers
Eredivisie players
NAC Breda players
DOSKO players
Footballers from North Brabant